Neal Patrick Dunn (born February 16, 1953) is an American surgeon and Republican Party politician serving as the U.S. representative for  since 2017.

Early life and career
Dunn was born in Boston, Massachusetts, on February 16, 1953. He earned a Bachelor of Science degree in interdisciplinary sciences from Washington and Lee University and a Doctor of Medicine from the George Washington University School of Medicine & Health Sciences. He completed his medical internship at Walter Reed Army Medical Center. Dunn served in the United States Army for 11 years of active duty, reaching the rank of major. He then settled in Panama City, Florida, where he helped found the Panama City Urological Center, the Panama City Surgery Center, and was the founding chairman of Summit Bank.

U.S. House of Representatives

Elections

2016 
The district's one-term incumbent, Democrat Gwen Graham, opted to retire after court-ordered redistricting made the district heavily Republican. He won the Republican nomination, narrowly defeating attorneys Mary Thomas and Ken Sukhia, and defeated Walter Dartland in the general election. He was sworn in on January 3, 2017.

Dunn's chief of staff, Brian Schubert, resigned in February 2018 after the House Ethics Committee launched an investigation into alleged sexual harassment by Schubert and Pat Meehan.

Dunn has held multiple virtual town hall meetings since the COVID-19 pandemic began in March 2020. He has told media outlets that he doesn't believe town halls are a productive format for engaging constituents. Constituents have voiced frustration with Dunn for his refusal to host town halls.

2018 
In 2018, Dunn won reelection against challenger Bob Rackleff, 67.4% to 32.6%.

2020 
Dunn has held multiple virtual town hall meetings since the COVID-19 pandemic began in March 2020. He has told media outlets that he doesn't believe town halls are a productive format for engaging constituents. Constituents have voiced frustration with Dunn for his refusal to host town halls. Despite this he was relected with 97% of the vote in 2020.

Committee assignments

 United States House Committee on Energy and Commerce
 Subcommittee on Health
 Subcommittee on Oversight and Investigations
 Subcommittee on Consumer Protection and Commerce

Caucus memberships
 Republican Study Committee

Political positions

Dunn's campaign website identifies him as conservative.

Gun policy
Dunn received an "AQ" rating from the NRA during his 2016 run for office—the highest rating possible for a non-incumbent. He does not support a ban of semi-automatic weapons. From 2015 to 2016, Dunn accepted $1,000 from the NRA's Political Victory Fund.

Net neutrality

Along with 107 Republican members of Congress, Dunn sent Federal Communications Commission Chairman Ajit Pai a letter on December 13, 2017, supporting his plan to repeal net neutrality protections ahead of the commission's vote. Dunn accepted $18,500 from the telecom industry before voting to repeal the rule.

Tax reform

Dunn voted for the Tax Cuts and Jobs Act of 2017, calling the bill "good medicine for America". He believes it will benefit many generations of Americans with a "great economy in which there will be jobs, there will be opportunity, there's possibilities for literally a whole new generation or two of Americans". Dunn says he has received support from "mostly small businessmen" in his district for supporting the bill.

Education

Dunn wants to defund the Department of Education.

Healthcare

Dunn supports repealing the Affordable Care Act, which he says is "failing", saying "no one can afford" the premiums and deductibles.

2020 presidential election certification
In December 2020, Dunn was one of 126 Republican members of the House of Representatives to sign an amicus brief in support of Texas v. Pennsylvania, a lawsuit filed at the United States Supreme Court contesting the results of the 2020 presidential election, in which Joe Biden defeated incumbent Donald Trump. The Supreme Court declined to hear the case on the basis that Texas lacked standing under Article III of the Constitution to challenge the results of an election held by another state.

After the 2021 storming of the Capitol, Dunn condemned the rioters, but still voted to object to the certification of several states' electoral votes.

Personal life
Dunn and his wife, Leah, have three sons and three grandsons. On April 9, 2020, Dunn's office announced that he tested positive for COVID-19.

Electoral history

See also
 Physicians in the United States Congress

References

External links
 Congressman Neal Dunn official U.S. House website
 Campaign website
 
 
 

1953 births
20th-century American physicians
21st-century American physicians
21st-century American politicians
American surgeons
George Washington University School of Medicine & Health Sciences alumni
Living people
People from Panama City, Florida
Physicians from Florida
Physicians from New Haven, Connecticut
Republican Party members of the United States House of Representatives from Florida
United States Army Medical Corps officers
United States Army officers
Washington and Lee University alumni
Conservatism in the United States